Funäsdalen is a village located in Härjedalen Municipality, Jämtland County, Sweden with 890 inhabitants in 2010. 
Funäsdalen is situated in western Härjedalen near the Norwegian border.
 
Funäsdalen is the site of Härjedalens Fjällmuseum which provides exhibits relating to mountain farming and Sami culture. Funäsdalen has long been a gathering place for Sámi people. The museum buildings were designed by architect Jörgen Grönvik. Inside the museum there is a permanent exhibition of work by sculptor Emil Näsvall (1908-1965). Adjacent to the museum is Fornminnesparken. This open-air museum provides a display of historic  buildings dating from the 16th century to the 19th century.

Funäsdalen Church (Funäsdalens kyrka) was built between 1926 and 1928 after drawings by the architects Curt Björklund (1895-1958) and Martin Westerberg (1892-1963). The building has a frame of brick. The altarpiece is attributed to the 17th century Dutch artist  Henricus Noêll. The church is in the parish of Tännäs-Ljusnedal of the Diocese of Härnösand.

Climate
Funäsdalen has a subarctic climate influenced by the combination of its high elevation and simultaneous deep valley position. This leads to high diurnal temperature variation and cooler summer days than its far inland position would suggest. Being a ski resort, Funäsdalen has lower accumulation than Storlien to its north, but retains a reliable snow pack due to the consistently cold temperatures. With the inversion at the lower elevations in the valley combined with longer nights in summer, frosts are common year round. The regular seasonal variation is slightly larger than Røros on the Norwegian side of the border, although the all-time temperature range is larger in the Norwegian town.

Gallery

References

External links
Härjedalens Fjällmuseum website

Populated places in Härjedalen Municipality
Härjedalen